Prundu Bârgăului is a commune in Bistrița-Năsăud County, Romania, in the historical region of Transylvania. It is composed of two villages, Prundu Bârgăului and Susenii Bârgăului (Felsőborgó).

Geography
The commune is located in the central-east part of the county, at the northeastern edge of the Transylvanian Plateau. It lies on the banks of the river Bistrița, a river sometimes referred to as Bistrița ardeleană or Bistricioara. The river Bârgău flows through the commune and discharges there into the Bistrița. 

It borders the following communes: Leșu to the north, Josenii Bârgăului to the west, Livezile to the south, Bistrița Bârgăului to the southeast, and Tiha Bârgăului to the east.

National road  (part of European route E58) connects Bistrița Bârgăului to the county seat, Bistrița,  to the west, and to Vatra Dornei,  to the east, in Suceava County.

History
Although the information about the remote past of the Bârgău Valley is scarce and fragmented, the archaeological remains reveal that the valley was inhabited since the end of the Neolithic Age or the beginning of the Bronze Age. After the conquest of Dacia by the Romans and its colonization, the Roman rule extended to the western border of the Bârgău Valley. After the withdrawal of the Roman rule, the region was crossed by different migratory peoples of Slavic  (from the 7th century) and Turkic origin, who left names in the local toponymy (e.g., the Slavic origin names of Bistrița, Tiha, Miroslava).

In the 13th and early 14th century, after it entered into and organized Transylvania as a vassal voivodeship, the Hungarian crown sought to also control the mountain valleys of Transylvania. The Bârgău region is attested for the first time with the occasion of these attempts. The first documentary attestation of the Bârgău, appearing under the name Borgo, dates back to 1317, when a committee of officials of the Doboka  and Szolnok counties made a division of properties in the Bârgău Mountains between the related nobility families Bethlen and Apaffy.

Current affairs
The Heniu Prundu Bârgăului is a women's football club based in the commune. Founded in 2013, the club plays in Liga I, the first tier of the Romanian women's football system. The Heniu stadium has a capacity of 500.

Prundu Bârgăului is the headquarters of the 817th Artillery Battalion "Petru Rareș". Founded in 1995, this unit of the Romanian Land Forces is part of the 81st Mechanized Brigade "General Grigore Bălan", which is aligned with the German Army's Rapid Forces Division and is headquartered in Bistrița.

Natives
Alexander Gassner (born 1989), German skeleton racer 
Monica Lăzăruț (born 1977), Romanian cross-country skier

References

Communes in Bistrița-Năsăud County
Localities in Transylvania